BodyVox is a dance company based in Portland, Oregon, United States, and was formed in 1997 on commission from the Portland Opera. The company blends contemporary dance with dance theater, and often makes use of other performance art form such as live music. In addition to their performances, the company has worked extensively with film and multi-media. BodyVox's collection of short films "Modern Daydreams" was a collaboration with performance artist and film maker Mitchell Rose, and the film won the American Choreography Award for Outstanding Achievement in Short Film in 2002.

Repertory
Carmina Burana – 1997 (with the Portland Opera)
The Big Room – 1998
A thousand little cities – 2000
The Cunning Little Vixen - 2000 (with the Portland Opera)
Reverie – 2001
Zapped – 2001
Water Bodies – 2004
Civilization Unplugged – 2005
Macbeth - 2006 (with the Portland Opera)
First Impressions Series Volume 1-5 – 2001-2007
Horizontal Leanings – 2008
Foot Opera Files – 2009
Chronos/Kairos - 2010
Smoke Soup – 2010
BloodyVox – 2010
The Cutting Room – 2012
The Soldier's Tale – 2012 (with Chamber Music Northwest)
Firewall – 2014 
Cosmosis – 2015 (with the Amphion String Quartet)
Death and Delight -2016
Rain and Roses -2018
The Pearl Dive Project -2016, 2019, 2021
BloodyVox: Lockdown -2020, Feature film of BloodyVox

Personnel
Jamey Hampton – Co-founder and Co-artistic Director

A Portland native, Hampton began his dance training in his hometown and furthered his study of artistic mediums at Dartmouth College, where he graduated with a BFA in drama. In 1978, Jamey joined Pilobolus dance theater; he later was an original member of MOMIX, and co-founded ISO Dance with his wife Ashley Roland. The duo founded BodyVox in 1997. 

Ashley Roland – Co-founder and Co-artistic Director

Ashley Roland is a Connecticut native and began her dance training in New York City in the David Howard and Alvin Ailey studios, continuing her studies at North Carolina School of the Arts. Ashley joined MOMIX Dance Theater as a choreographer and dancer in 1983 and four years later she cofounded ISO Dance with her husband Jamey Hampton. The duo founded BodyVox in 1997.

References

"BodyVox tricks up the time machine"  Oregon Arts Watch May 2013 http://www.orartswatch.org/bodyvox-tricks-up-the-time-machine/
BodyVox. 2009. BodyVox. http://www.bodyvox.com/.
New Bodyvox Show: Horizontal Leanings…. May 3, 2008. The Portland Mercury.  https://web.archive.org/web/20080829123848/http://blogtown.portlandmercury.com/2008/05/new_bodyvox_show_horizontal_le.php
DANCE REVIEW; BodyVox, Grown From Pilobolus But Also a Distinctive Departure. March 11, 2004. The New York Times. https://www.nytimes.com/2004/03/11/arts/dance-review-bodyvox-grown-from-pilobolus-but-also-a-distinctive-departure.html

Dance in Oregon